Harold Hochstatter (born October 26, 1937) is an American politician who served in the Washington House of Representatives from the 13th district from 1991 to 1992 and in the Washington State Senate from the 13th district from 1992 to 2003.

References

1937 births
Living people
Republican Party members of the Washington House of Representatives
Republican Party Washington (state) state senators